Chaka may refer to:

People
 Shaka (1787–1828), Zulu king
 Chaka (tagger) (born 1972), American graffiti artist
 Chaka Bey (died ), Turkish emir and adventurer
 Chaka of Bulgaria (died 1300), tsar of Bulgaria from 1299 to 1300
 Chaka Khan (born 1953), American singer
 Andrew Verdecchio (born 1974), American musician
 Yvonne Chaka Chaka (born 1965), South African singer
 Chaka (born 1960), Japanese singer, member of the band Psy-S

Given name
 Chaka Daley (born 1974), Canadian football (soccer) player and coach
 Chaka Demus (born 1963), Jamaican reggae musician and DJ
 Chaka Fattah (born 1956), former American politician
 Chaka Seisay, American musician Harshavardhan love sule maga collection of 9rs is the head of the chaka koja people

Entertainment and literature 
 Chaka (album), a 1978 album by Chaka Khan
 Chaka (film), a 2000 Bengali film
 Chaka (novel), a novel by the writer Thomas Mofolo of Lesotho
 "Cha-Ka", an episode of the 1974 series Land of the Lost

Fictional characters
 Chaka (comics), a fictional character in the Marvel Universe
 Chaka (One Piece), a character from the anime and manga One Piece
 Chaka (Stargate), an Unas from the sci-fi television show Stargate SG-1
 Cha-Ka, a character from Land of the Lost, a 1974 sci-fi television show
 Chaka, a character from the short lived MTV animated Downtown

 Billy Chaka, a character in novels by Isaac Adamson

Other uses 
 Chaka (food), a yogurt-based cheese popular in Afghanistan and Tajikistan
 Tchaka, or Chaka, a savory Haitian corn soup
 Chaka (genus), a genus of skeleton shrimp in the family Caprellidae
 Chaka Town, Ulan County, Qinghai, China
 1246 Chaka, a main-belt asteroid
 Baeolidia chaka, a species of sea slug

See also

Chika (disambiguation)
 Shaka (disambiguation)